Simly Dam is an  high earthen embankment dam on the Soan River,  east of Islamabad and Rawalpindi in Rawalpindi District, Punjab, Pakistan. It is the largest reservoir of drinking water to people living in Islamabad, the capital of Pakistan. The water stored in this dam is fed by the melting snow & natural springs of Murree hills. It was developed by the Capital Development Authority. Planning for the dam began in 1962 and it was not completed when expected in 1972 due to project delays. It was completed in 1983.

Recreation
Boating and Fishing are two main activities here. For fishing, you need to have license (permission) from Capital Development Authority.

References

External links 
Simly Dam trip
A day trip to Simply Dam by Shaikh Muhammad Ali

Native Wild Life 
Asiatic leopard
Wild boar
Golden Jackal
Rhesus Macaque
Leopard cat
Gray Goral sheep
Barking deer
Chinkara gazelle
Red fox
Pangolin
Porcupine 
Yellow throated marten
Fruit bats

Dams in Punjab, Pakistan
Dams completed in 1983